This is a list of gliders/sailplanes of the world, (this reference lists all gliders with references, where available) 
Note: Any aircraft can glide for a short time, but gliders are designed to glide for longer.

S

SABCA
(SABCA - Société Anonyme Belge de Construction Aéronautique)
 SABCA Junior
 SABCA Jullien SJ-1 – Henri Jullien / SABCA

Sablier 
(Georges Sablier)
 Sablier 1922
 Sablier 1923 Hyper-léger
 Sablier S-01
 Sablier S-03
 Sablier S-07 1930 Aile volante
 Sablier S-08
 Sablier S-10
 Sablier S-11
 Sablier S-14
 Sablier S-14 bis
 Sablier S-16
 Sablier S-18
 Sablier S-19
 Sablier S-19 Biplace
 Sablier Type 19 Biplace Motoplaneur 1935 Motoplaneur
 Sablier Type 19A 1935
 Sablier S-20
 Sablier S-21 1930
 Sablier S-23
 Sablier S-24 Démontable
 Sablier S-26
 Sablier S-26 Hydro
 Sablier S-28 1930
 Sablier S-32 1930
 Sablier S-36 1930
 Sablier S-52 Motoplaneur
 Sablier Type Enseignement Biplace
 Sablier Type Enseignement Ecole
 Sablier Type Enseignement Performance
 Sablier Type Grand Sport
 Sablier Type Montevideo	1936
 Sablier de Rouge
 Sablier Ecole-E
 Sablier GS-11
 Sablier Perfo-E
 Sablier Sport

Saboureault-Boussiere-Touza
(Paul Saboureault, Edouard Boussiere & Joseph Touza)
 Saboureault-Boussiere-Touza SBT

SAI-Ambrosini 
 SAI-Ambrosini CVV-6 Cangaro
 SAI-Ambrosini CVV-7 Pinocchio
 SAI-Ambrosini CVV-8 Bonaventura

Sailplane Corporation of America
 Sailplane BG-6
 Sailplane BG-8

Sala
(Ditta Sala - firm Sala)
 Sala N-1

Salavieju
(V. Šalaviejus)
 Salaviejus Aitvaras
 Salavejus primary

Saloni
(Bronisław Saloni)
 Saloni 1910 Glider

SALS 
(Service de l'Aviation Légère et Sportive en Algérie)
 SALS DACAL 105
 SALS DACAL 106

Sancho
(Orfeo Sancho, Francisco Huguenin, José Huguenin  & Víctor Ruiz)
 Sancho Primario

Sandlin 
(Mike Sandlin)
 Sandlin Bug
 Sandlin Goat
 Sandlin Pig

Sands
(Ron Sands Sr.)
 Sands Replica 1929 Primary Glider

Sato Maeda
(Hiroshi Sato & Keniti Maeda)
 Sato ASO-1
 Sato Kyutei-5
 Sato Kyutei-7
 Sato Maeda 1 – (佐藤・前田1号(九帝l号))
 Sato Maeda 2 – (佐藤・前田2号(九帝E号))
 Sato Maeda 3 – (九帝3型(十文字号))
 Sato Maeda BS
 Sato Maeda E – (佐藤・前田E号(九帝E号))
 Sato TC – built by Ito
 Sato Maeda SM-206

Saucède
(Lucien &  Pierre Saucède)
 Saucède PLS-1

Saurma-Jeltsch
(Johann Friedrich Maria Eberhard Sylvius von Saurma - Graf von Saurma-Jeltsch)
 Saurma-Jeltsch motor-glider

Savoyas
(Laurent Savoyas)
 Savoyas Hirondelle
 Sayers SCW – Sayers, W. H. & Courtney, & Wright – Central Aircraft Company* Sayers SCW – Sayers, W. H. & Courtney, & Wright – Central Aircraft Company
(W. H. Sayers, Courtney & Wright / Central Aircraft Company)
 Sayers SCW

Scanlan
(Thomas W. Scanlan)
 Scanlan SG-1A

SCAP-Lanaverre
(SCAP - Société de Commercialisation Aéronautique du Plessis SàRL with Lanaverre Industries)
 SCAP-Lanaverre CS-II Cirrus
 SCAP-Lanaverre SL-2 Janus

Scheibe
 Scheibe Mü 13E Bergfalke
 Scheibe Bergfalke II/55
 Scheibe Bergfalke III
 Scheibe Bergfalke IV
 Scheibe Specht
 Scheibe Sperber
 Scheibe Spatz
 Scheibe L-Spatz 55
 Scheibe Zugvogel (multiple subtypes)
 Scheibe SF-24 Motorspatz
 Scheibe SF 25 Falke
 Scheibe SF 25E Super-Falke
 Scheibe SF-26 Super Spatz
 Scheibe SF 27
 Scheibe SF 27M
 Scheibe SF 28 Tandem-Falke
 Scheibe SF 30 Club Spatz
 Sportavia-Pützer SFS 31 Milan
 Scheibe SF 32
 Scheibe SF 33
 Scheibe SF 34 Delphin
 Scheibe SF 36
 Scheibe SF 40 Mini Falke
 Scheibe SF 41 Merlin

Schempp-Hirth
(Schempp-Hirth Flugzeugbau GmbH)
 Göppingen Gö 1 Wolf
 Göppingen Gö 2
 Göppingen Gö 3 Minimoa
 Göppingen Gö 4 Gövier
 Göppingen Gö 5
 Schempp-Hirth Arcus
 Standard Austria
 Schempp-Hirth Cirrus
 Schempp-Hirth Discus
 Schempp-Hirth Discus 2
 Schempp-Hirth Duo Discus
 Schempp-Hirth Janus
 Schempp-Hirth Mini-Nimbus
 Schempp-Hirth Nimbus
 Schempp-Hirth Nimbus 2
 Schempp-Hirth Nimbus 3
 Schempp-Hirth Nimbus 3D
 Schempp-Hirth Nimbus 3DM
 Schempp-Hirth Nimbus 3DT
 Schempp-Hirth Nimbus 4
 Schempp-Hirth Quintus
 Schempp-Hirth SHK
 Schempp-Hirth Standard Cirrus
 Schempp-Hirth Ventus
 Schempp-Hirth Ventus 2
 Schempp-Hirth Ventus 3

Scherler
(Hermann Scherler / SG Biel)
 Scherler HS-1

Schleicher
(Alexander Schleicher GmbH & Co)
 Schleicher Hols der Teufel
 Schleicher EW 18
 Schleicher Luftkurort Poppenhausen
 Schleicher Rhönadler
 Schleicher Rhönbussard
 Schleicher Rhönlerche
 Schleicher Ka-2 Rhönschwalbe
 Schleicher Ka-3 (a.k.a. Kaiser Ka-3)
 Schleicher Ka-4 Rhönlerche II
 Schleicher Ka-6 Rhönsegler
 Schleicher Ka-6E
 Schleicher Ka-7
 Schleicher K7/13
 Schleicher Ka-8
 Schleicher Ka-9
 Schleicher Ka-10
 Schleicher ASW 12
 Schleicher ASK 13
 Schleicher ASK 14 (Ka 12 renamed)
 Schleicher ASW 15
 Schleicher ASK 16
 Schleicher ASW 17
 Schleicher ASK 18
 Schleicher ASW 19
 Schleicher ASW 20
 Schleicher ASK 21
 Schleicher ASW 22
 Schleicher ASK 23
 Schleicher ASW 24
 Schleicher ASH 25
 Schleicher ASH 26
 Schleicher ASW 27
 Schleicher ASW 28
 Schleicher ASG 29
 Schleicher ASH 30 Mi
 Schleicher ASH 31 Mi
 Schleicher ASG 32
 Schleicher AS 33
 Schleicher AS 34Me
 Schleicher AS 35

Šlechta
 Šlechta PB.3 Praha

Schmid
(Jaromír Schmid)
 Schmid S-1
 Schmid S-3

Schmid
(M. Schmid)
 Schmid MS-4
 Schmid MS-5

Schmutzhart
(Berthold Schmutzhart)
 Schmutzhart SCH-1

Schneider
(Grunau Riesengebirge / Flugzeugbau Schneider / Edmund Schneider Grünau (ESG))
 Grunau ESG 29
 Schneider ESG 31 Schlesierland
 Schneider Stanavo
 Schneider SG-38 Schulgleiter
 Schneider Grünau Commodore
 Schneider Grunau 6
 Schneider Grünau 7 Moazagotl
 Schneider Grünau 8
 Schneider Grunau 9
 Schneider Grunau Baby
 Schneider Grunau Baby II
 Schneider Grunau Baby IIa
 Schneider Grunau Baby IIb
 Schneider Grunau Baby III
 Schneider Grunau Baby 3
 Schneider Grunau Baby 4
 Schneider Grunau Baby V
 Schneider TG-27 Grunau Baby
 Schneider SM-5
 Schneider Motorbaby
 Schneider ES-49 Wallaby
 Schneider ES-49b Kangaroo
 Schneider ES-50 Club Two-Seater
 Schneider ES-52 Kookaburra
 Schneider ES-54 Gnome
 Schneider ES-56 Nymph
 Schneider ES-57 Kingfisher
 Schneider ES-59 Arrow
 Schneider ES-60 Boomerang
 Schneider ES-60B Super Arrow
 Schneider ES-65 Platypus																																																																																																																																																																																																																																																																																																																																																																																																																																																																																																																																																																																																																																																																																																																																																																																																																																																																																																																																																																																																																																																														
 Edelweiss-Baby (Oberlerchner, Spittal)

Schreder
(Richard Schreder)
 Schreder HP-7
 Schreder Airmate HP-8
 Schreder Airmate HP-9
 Schreder Airmate HP-10
 Schreder Airmate HP-11
 Schreder HP-12
 Schreder HP-12A
 Schreder HP-13
 Schreder HP-14
 Schreder HP-15
 Schreder RS-15
 Schreder HP-16
 Schreder HP-17
 Schreder HP-18
 Schreder HP-19
 Schreder HP-20
 Schreder HP-21
 Schreder HP-22

Schröder-Peters
(Josef Schröder & Josef & Heinz Peters / Flugzeugbau Köhler/Peters)
 Schröder-Peters SP-1 V1

Schubert
(Ekkehard Carlos Fernando Schubert & Sorocaba Tecsis)
 Schubert P-1

Schul-Marczinski
 Schul-Marczinski Stadt Magdeburg

Schultz 
 Schultz ABC
 Schultz TG-16
 Schultz Nucleon

Schulz 
(Ferdinand Schulz)
 Schulz FS-1
 Schulz FS-3 Besenstie
 Schulz FS-5
 Schulz Königin Luise

Schwarzwald
(Schwarzwald Flugzeugbau Donaueschingen GmbH)
 Schwarzwald Strolch (RLM 108-62)
 Schwarzwald Ibis (RLM 108-64)

Schweizer
(Schweizer Aircraft Corporation)
Note: Schweizer glider designations are in the format n-nn. The first number denotes the number of seats and the second number is the model number)
 Schweizer SGP 1-1
 Schweizer SGU 1-2
 Schweizer SGU 1-3
 Schweizer SGU 1-6
 Schweizer SGU 1-7
 Schweizer SGS 2-8
 Schweizer SGC 8-10 (alternative designation for the SGC 9-10)
 Schweizer SGC 9-10
 Schweizer SGC 15-11
 Schweizer SGS 2-12
 Schweizer SGC 6-14
 Schweizer SGC 1-15
 Schweizer SGU 1-16
 Schweizer SGS 1-17
 Schweizer SGS 2-18
 Schweizer SGU 1-19
 Schweizer SGU 1-20
 Schweizer SGS 1-21
 Schweizer SGU 2-22
 Schweizer SGS 1-23
 Schweizer SGS 1-24
 Schweizer SGS 2-25
 Schweizer SGS 1-26
 Schweizer 2-27
 Schweizer 7-28
 Schweizer SGS 1-29
 Schweizer SA 1-30
 Schweizer 2-31
 Schweizer SGS 2-32
 Schweizer SGS 2-33
 Schweizer SGS 1-34
 Schweizer SGS 1-35
 Schweizer SGS 1-36 Sprite
 Schweizer SGM 2-37
 Schweizer TG-2
 Schweizer TG-3
 Schweizer TG-7A
 Schweizer RG-8A
 Schweizer X-26 Frigate
 Schweizer LNS
 Schweizer cargo glider designs

 Scott 
(Scott Light Aircraft Ltd / W.R. Scott)
 Scott Viking 1
 Scott Viking 2
 Scott Hütter 17

Scrive-Coquard
(Didier Scrive & Marcel Coquard)
 Scrive 1908 glider
 Scrive-Coquard SC

SCSA
(Southern California Soaring Association)
 SCSA Stratosailplane I
 SCSA Stratosailplane II

Searby
(H. A. Searby)
 Searby Special

Seehase
(Hans Seehase)
 Seehase MD-2

 Segelflugzeugwerke 
(Segelflugzeugwerke GmbH, Baden-Baden)
 Baden-Baden Stolz – Friedrich Wenk
 Bremen – Alexander Lippisch & F. Stamer
 Feldberg – Friedrich Wenk
 Hols der Teufel – Alexander Lippisch & F. Stamer
 Roland Festung – R. Eisenlohr

Segno
(Henryk Segno)
 Segno 1910 glider

Seiler
(E. Seiler)
 Seiler D-1

Sekcja Lotnicza
(Warsaw technical university Aviation Section)
 S.L.1 Akar
 S.L.2 Czarny Kot (Black Cat) No.6 (a.k.a. J.D.1)
 S.L.3 No.3
 S.L.4 (a.k.a. JD.2)

Sellars-Jordan
(J. L. Sellars & K. Jordan)
 Sellars-Jordan KJS-1

Sellers
(Matthew B. Sellers)
 Sellers 1908 Quadruplane glider

Senbergas
(V. Senbergas)
 Senbergas S-1

Sergiuz Czerwiński
(Sergiuz Czerwiński)
 Sergiuz Czerwiński glider

Sevimia
(Société d'Études Victor Minié Aéronautiques / Victor Minié Aviation)
 Sevimia SM-20

Shackleton
(William Stancliffe Shackleton)
 Shackleton Lark

 Sheremetyev 
(Boris Nikolayevich Sheremetyev)
 Sheremetyev SH-03
 Sheremetyev SH-04 Temp
 Sheremetyev SH-05
 Sheremetyev SH-08
 Sheremetyev SH-10
 Sheremetyev SH-16
 Sheremetyev SH-17
 Sheremetyev SH-18
 Sheremetyev XXX Let
 Sheremetyev-Kochetkov Oktyabrenok – Boris Nikolayevich Sheremetyev & Kochetkov

 Shorts 
(Short Brothers)
 Short Nimbus
 Short SA.9 – Air Ministry Specification X.30/46
 Short SB.1

SIAI-Marchetti
 SIAI-Marchetti Eolo 3V-1

Sidou
(Antonio Menezes Sidou)
 Sidou João Grande

Siebert
(Wilhelm Kurten / Paul Siebert, Mariendorferstrasse 38, 44 Münster)
 Siebert Sie-3 (a.k.a. Kurten Sie-3)

 Siegel 
(Mieczysław Siegel)
 Siegel MS-01
 Siegel MS-02
 Siegel MS-03
 Siegel MS-04
 Siegel MS-08 Wróbel
 Siegel MS-09 Wróbel II
 Siegel MS-10 Wróbel III
 Siegel MS-11
 Siegel MS-12
 Siegel MS-13 Bocian
 Siegel MS-14
 Siegel Skrzydlaty Rower 1911

Silva
(C. Silva / Aeronautica Lombarda)
 Silva AL-3

Siren SA
 Siren C30S Edelweiss
 Siren C34S Edelweiss 4
 Siren E-75 Sagittaire
 Siren E-78 Silène
 Siren PIK-30

Slamka-Plesko
(Rudolf Slamka &  Štefan Plesko)
 Slamka-Plesko SP-II Osa

SLCA
(Société Lorraine de Constructions Aéronautique)
 SLCA KV.1
 SLCA-10 Topaze
 SLCA-11 Topaze

Šlechta
(Jaroslav Šlechta)
 Šlechta Praha PB-3
 Šlechta Skaut 1930
 Šlechta Standart 1932
 Šlechta Skaut Standart 1936
 Šlechta Krakonoš 1922
 Šlechta Praha-II Delfín 1935

Slingsby
(Slingsby Sailplanes/Slingsby Aviation)
 Baynes Bat – experimental glider 1943
 Schreder HP-14
 Slingsby T.1 Falcon 1
 Slingsby T.2 Falcon 2
 Slingsby T.3 Dagling
 Slingsby T.4 Falcon 3
 Slingsby T.5 Grunau Baby
 Slingsby T.6 Kite
 Slingsby T.7 Kirby Cadet
 Slingsby T.8 Kirby Tutor
 Slingsby T.9 King Kite
 Slingsby T.12 Kirby Gull 1
 Slingsby T.13 Petrel
 Slingsby T.14 Kirby Gull 2
 Slingsby T.15 Kirby Gull 3
 Slingsby T.16
 Slingsby T.17
 Slingsby T.18 Hengist
 Slingsby T.19
 Slingsby T.20
 Slingsby T.21
 Slingsby T.22 Petrel 2
 Slingsby T.23 Kirby Kite 1A
 Slingsby T.23A
 Slingsby T.24 Falcon 4
 Slingsby T.25 Gull 4
 Slingsby T.26 Kite 2
 Slingsby T.27 Black Widow
 Slingsby T.28
 Slingsby T.29A/B Motor Tutor
 Slingsby T.30 Prefect
 Slingsby T.31 Tandem Tutor
 Slingsby T.32 Gull 4B
 Slingsby T.33
 Slingsby T.34 Sky
 Slingsby T.35 Austral
 Slingsby T.36
 Slingsby T.37 Skylark 1
 Slingsby T.38 Grasshopper
 Slingsby T.39 target to Spec. WT1/RDL.3
 Slingsby T.41 Skylark 2
 Slingsby T.42 Eagle
 Slingsby T.43 Skylark 3
 Slingsby T.44 Stratoferic
 Slingsby T.45 Swallow
 Slingsby T.46
 Slingsby T.47
 Slingsby T.48
 Slingsby T.49 Capstan
 Slingsby T.50 Skylark 4
 Slingsby T.51 Dart
 Slingsby T.52
 Slingsby T.53 Phoenix
 Slingsby T.54
 Slingsby T.55 Regal Eagle
 Slingsby T.59 Kestrel
 Slingsby T.61 Falke
 Slingsby T.65 Vega

Skurauskas-Mikevicius
(Skurauskas & Mikevicius)
 Skurauskas & Mikevicius Gandras (based on German glider)

Soko
(Sour Vazduhoplovna Industrija Soko, Radna Organizacija Vazduhoplovstvo Mostar)
 Soko SL-40 Liska

Solar Flight
(Solar Flight/Eric Scott Raymond)
 Sunseeker I
 Sunseeker II
 Sunseeker Duo

 Šoštarić 
(Ivo Šoštarić / SVC / UTVA, Pančevo (Slovénie))
 Šoštarić-Humek S.H.1 Sroka
 Šoštarić-Humek Metla
 Šoštarić-Humek Svraka
 Šoštarić Assault Glider
 Šoštarić Čavka
 Šoštarić Jastreb
 Šoštarić Roda
 Šoštarić Sokól
 Šoštarić Vrabac
 Šoštarić Štorklja (Roda - two-seat primary)

Souczek-Rainer
(Prof. Ernst Souczek with Franz Rainer / Austrian Acro Club Central Plant Facility & ObWm Kasper, Wien)
 Souczek Bussard II

Southdown
(Southdown Aero Services)
 Southdown Aero Services Colditz Cock replica

Southdown Skysailing Club
(Southdown Skysailing Club / Leeroy Brown)
 Southdown Skysailer (Brown 1931 glider)

 SpaceShipOne 
 SpaceShipOne Rocketplane

 SpaceShipTwo 
 SpaceShipTwo VSS Enterprise
 SpaceShipTwo VSS Unity

Spalinger
(Jakob Spalinger)
 Spalinger Austria I
 Spalinger Kranich
 Spalinger S.01
 Spalinger S.05
 Spalinger S.08	
 Spalinger S.09
 Spalinger S.10 Zürivogel
 Spalinger S.11
 Spalinger S.12
 Spalinger S.14
 Spalinger S.15
 Spalinger S.15 Spez.
 Spalinger S.15a Austria II
 Spalinger S.15b
 Spalinger S.15c Milan
 Spalinger S.15K
 Spalinger S.16
 Spalinger S.16 II
 Spalinger S.16K
 Spalinger S.17
 Spalinger S.18
 Spalinger S.19
 Spalinger S-19m
 Spalinger S.20
 Spalinger S.21
 Spalinger S.22
 Spalinger S.23 Avional
 Spalinger S.24
 Spalinger S.25
 Spalinger S.27
 Spalinger S.28
 Lost (glider) (Jakob Spalinger, Fritz Stamer, Alexander Martin Lippisch & Hessel)

Spengler
(Hans Spengler)
 Spengler HS3 Skikarus

Špitálský
(Jaroslav Špitálský)
 Špitálský ŠPŠ-1 Bábinka
 Špitálský ŠP-2 Kamarád
 Špitálský ŠP-2A Fortuna

Spivak-Kolesnikov
(D. N. Kolesnikov & Spivak)
 Spivak-Kolesnikov Vega-1
 Spivak-Kolesnikov Vega-2

Sportárutermelõ Vállalat
(Hungary)
 Sportárutermelõ Vállalat C-2 Cinke – modified DFS Meise

Sportinė Aviacija (LAK)
See: LAK

 Sports Aériens 
 Sports Aériens SA-103 prone pilot
 Sports aériens SA-103 Émouchet
 Sports Aériens SA-104 Émouchet
 Sports Aériens SA-104 Émouchet Escopette
 Sports Aériens SA-110 Eider

Spratt
(George A. Spratt)
 Spratt 1909 glider
 Spratt 1929 glider

Sproule-Ivanoff
(J. S. Sproule,  & A. Ivanoff / Scott Light Aircraft Ltd)
 Sproule-Ivanoff Camel

St. Louis
 St Louis CG-5
 St Louis CG-6
 St Louis SL-5

Stähls
(Bodo Stähls)
 Stähls Lo 170

Stanięda
(Emanuel Stanięda)
 Stanięda 1
 Stanięda 2 
 Stanięda 3

Stanisavljevic
 Glisa Stanisavljevic GS-1

Stanko
(Obad Stanko)
 Stanko Musa SO-2

Stanley
(Robert M. Stanley)
 Stanley Nomad

Stark
(André Starck)
 Stark AS-07 Stabiplan

Starr
(Sterling Starr)
 Starr 1-23HM

 Start + Flug 
 Hänle H-101 Salto
 Hänle H-111 Hippie
 Hänle H-121 Globetrotter

Stedman
(R. F. Stedman R. F. / Bradford & County Gliding Club)
 Stedman TS-1 City of Leeds

Steinleher-Huber
(Fritz Steinleher sen. & Peter Huber)
 Steinleher-Huber SH-2H

Steinruck
(Wade Steinruck)
 Steinruck SCS-1

Stemme(Stemme GmbH & Co KG) Stemme S2 – unpowered glider, 2 seater
 Stemme S6 – touring motorglider
 Stemme S7 – unpowered glider, 2 seater
 Stemme S8 – touring motorglider
 Stemme S10 – Self Launching motorglider and original aircraft
 Stemme S12
 Stemme S15 – Prototype UAV based on S6
 Stemme TG-11A
 Stemme ASP S15

Sterz
 Sterz P-77 – motorglider regn D-KHOP

Stevens
(Stevens Institute of Technology / Roswell Earl Franklin)
 Stevens SU-1 
 Stevens-Franklin

Stoerl
(W. Stoerl)
 Stoerl 1911 glider

Stralpes Aéro
(Stralpes Aéro SARL)
 Stralpes Aéro ST-11
 Stralpes Aéro ST-15

Stratos
(Stratos Unternehmungsberatung GmbH)
 Stratos 500

Strauber-Frommhold
(Strauber-Frommhold GmbH)
 Strauber-Frommhold Mistral

 Streifeneder 
(Hansjörg Streifeneder)
 Streifeneder Albatros
 Streifeneder Eta
 Streifeneder-Hansen Falcon

Strojnik
(Professor Alex Strojnik)
 Strojnik S-2
 Strojnik S-2A
 Strojnik S-4 Laminar Magic
 Strojnik S-5

Štros
(Vladimir Štros)
 Štros K-2 Sova
 Štros K-3 Sokol

Studer-Sägesser
(Walter Studer & Rudolf Sägesser)
 Studer SH-1
 Studer WS-1 Habicht –  Walter Studer
 Studer-Sägesser WS-1 Lilli – Walter Studer & Rudolf Sägesser

Stupnicki
(Jacek Stupnicki)
 Stupnicki AV-51
 Stupnicki AV-5l (alternative erroneous designation ?)

Stuttgart
(P. Brenner & M. Schrenk / Flugtechnische Verein Stuttgart)
 Stuttgart I
 Stuttgart II

Suchý
(Jindřich & Karel Suchý)
 Suchý BS-1 
 Suchý BS-2 Olešná

 Sukhanov 
(Mignon V. Sukhanov / Sukhanova Novossibirsk)
 Sukhanov Diskoplan 1
 Sukhanov Diskoplan 2
 Sukhanov Diskoplan 3
 Sukhanov Diskoplan 4
 Sukhanov X-tail (Soviet spacecraft crew escape pod?)

 Sunderland 
(Gary Sunderland)
 Sunderland MOBA 2
 Sunderland MOBA 3 Virago

Suranyi-Hegedús
 Suranyi-Hegedús I

Svachulay
(Sándor Svachulay)
 Svachulay Albatross
 Svachulay Szent György I
 Svachulay Szent György II

 SVC 
(Savezni Vazduhoplovni Centar'')
 SVC Cavka
 SVC Mačka
 SVC Vrabac A

Swales
(Swales Developments)
 Swales SD3-15

Swaty
(Franz Swaty)
 Swaty Kandidat

Swift
(Swift Ltd.)
 Swift S-1

Sydney University Gliding Club
 SUT-1 – (Sydney University Trainer 1)
 SUT-2 – (Sydney University Trainer 2)

Szokolay-Jancso
(András Szokolay & Endre Jancso / MSrE; Aero Ever Ltd., Aircraft Factory of Transylvania; different workshops of Aero Clubs)
 Szokolay-Jancso M-22

Szybowcowy Zakład Doświadczalny
 SZD-C Żuraw Crane
 SZD-6x Nietoperz (Bat)
 SZD-7 Osa (Wasp)
 SZD-8 Jaskółka (Swallow)
 SZD-9 Bocian (Stork)
 SZD-10 Czapla (Heron)
 SZD-11 Albatros (Albatross)
 SZD-12 Mucha 100 (Fly 100)
 SZD-13 Wampir (Vampire)
 SZD-14x Jaskółka M (Swallow M)
 SZD-15 Sroka (Magpie)
 SZD-16 Gil (Bullfinch)
 SZD-17x Jaskółka L (Swallow L)
 SZD-18 Czajka (Lapwing)
 SZD-19 Zefir (Zephyr)
 SZD-20x Wampir 2 (Vampire)
 SZD-21 Kobuz (Lerche Falcon)
 SZD-22 Mucha Standard (Fly Standard)
 SZD-23 Bocian 2 (Stork 2)
 SZD-24 Foka (Seal)
 SZD-25 Nov
 SZD-25A Lis (Fox)
 SZD-26 Wilk (Wolf)
 SZD-27 Kormoran (Cormorant)
 SZD-28 Latające laboratorium / Kondor (Flying Laboratory / Condor)
 SZD-29 Zefir 3 (Zephyr 3)
 SZD-30 Pirat (Pirate)
 SZD-31 Zefir 4 (Zephyr 4)
 SZD-32A Foka 5 (Seal 5)
 SZD-33 Bocian 3 (Stork)
 SZD-34 Bocian 3 (Ver. 2) (Stork 3 ver.2)
 SZD-35 Bekas (Snipe)
 SZD-36 Cobra 15 (Cobra)
 SZD-37x Jantar (Amber)
 SZD-38 Jantar 1 (Amber)
 SZD-39 Cobra 17 (Cobra 17)
 SZD-40x Halny (Föhn)
 SZD-41 Jantar Standard (Amber Standard)
 SZD-42 Jantar 2 (Amber 2)
 SZD-43 Orion
 SZD-45 Ogar (Bloodhound)
 SZD-48 Jantar Standard 2 (Amber Standard 2 and 3)
 SZD-49 Jantar K (Amber K)
 SZD-50 Puchacz (Eagle owl)
 SZD-51 Junior

Szynkiewicz
(Roman Szynkiewicz)
 Roman Szynkiewicz's Glider

Notes

Further reading

External links

Lists of glider aircraft